Haute Route Cycling Series is a series of multi-day cyclosportive events held on mountain roads around the world.

The premiere event is the Haute Route Alps, a seven-day, 800 km event from Megève to Nice. The five-day events are the Haute Route Pyrenees (Girona to Pau) and Haute Route Dolomites (Cortina d'Ampezzo to Bormio). The three-day events are in Crans-Montana, Ventoux and Florianópolis.

The Haute Route Group was founded by Michael Hartweg. In February 2021, the Haute Route Group bought the Gravel Epic and Race Across France. In August 2021, the Haute Route Group was purchased by the Ironman Group.

References

External links
 Official website

Cyclosportives
Cycling organizations